Eriogonum parishii is a species of wild buckwheat known by the common name mountainmist.

Distribution
It is found mainly in southern California, where it grows in many of the mountain ranges from the Sierra Nevada, White Mountains and Inyo Mountains, west through the Transverse Ranges and Peninsular Ranges. It is also known from the southern Peninsular Ranges in Baja California, and in Yavapai County, Arizona.

It grows in various types of mountain slope habitat, such as sagebrush and chaparral, generally on granite sands.

Description
Eriogonum parishi is an annual herb producing clumps of spreading hairless green stems which are intricately branched. The hairy oval leaves are located around the base of the stems and are 2 to 6 centimeters long.

The inflorescence is a spreading array of clusters of tiny pink to reddish flowers with darker red midribs. Each individual flower is generally under a millimeter wide and fuzzy in texture.

External links
Jepson Manual Treatment of Eriogonum parishii
Eriogonum parishii — UC Photo gallery

parishii
Flora of Arizona
Flora of Baja California
Flora of California
Flora of the Sierra Nevada (United States)
Natural history of the California chaparral and woodlands
Natural history of the Peninsular Ranges
Natural history of the Santa Monica Mountains
Natural history of the Transverse Ranges
Flora without expected TNC conservation status